The 2020–21 season was SC Paderborn 07's 114th season in existence and the club's first season back in the second flight of German football. In addition to the domestic league, SC Paderborn 07 participated in this season's edition of the DFB-Pokal. The season covered the period from 1 July 2020 to 30 June 2021.

Players

First-team squad

Players out on loan

Transfers

Pre-season and friendlies

Competitions

Overview

2. Bundesliga

League table

Results summary

Results by round

Matches 
The league fixtures were announced on 7 August 2020.

DFB-Pokal

Statistics

Goalscorers

References

External links

SC Paderborn 07 seasons
SC Paderborn 07